Ghenadie Ochincă (born 1 March 1984) is a Moldovan footballer who plays as a defender for Dacia Buiucani in the Moldovan National Division.

He previously played for numerous Moldovan top-division clubs, and for Gloria Buzău in the Romanian Liga I. He was capped for Moldova at under-16 and under-21 level.

Club career
Ochincă was born in Kishinev, then in the Moldovan SSR, Soviet Union, which is now Chișinău, Moldova.

He played football for Politehnica Chişinău from 2005 until the 2007–08 season winter break.

After a trial with Universitatea Cluj where he impressed, but whose sporting director felt they needed more established players to assist their fight against relegation, Ochincă signed a four-and-a-half-year contract with Romanian Liga I side Gloria Buzău for a salary reported as €20,000 per season. The move was completed on 28 February 2008 after a delay in obtaining international clearance. He said he dreamt of playing for a big European club, and was making an important move by coming to a much stronger league than in Moldova. However, he made only one league appearance in six months with the club, playing the whole of the 2–0 away defeat at Unirea Urziceni on 20 March, before being transfer-listed. If he was unable to find another top-flight club in Romania, he was expected to return home to Moldova.

He had a trial with Romanian Liga II club Unirea Alba Iulia in August 2008, but ended up back home in Moldova with Iskra-Stal. He played ten league games, and made two substitute appearances in the second qualifying round of the Europa League, before Iskra-Stal released him during the 2009–10 winter break.

He then played for FC Rapid Ghidighici.

After a trial with Sfîntul Gheorghe in January 2011, he joined Academia UTM. He made 11 appearances in the top division before leaving at the end of the season.

In June 2011, he signed a two-year contract with Milsami, and went straight into the squad for the club's first ever match in European competition, the Europa League first qualifying round away to Dinamo Tbilisi four days later. He had an eventful debut: within seven minutes of replacing Adrian Grigoruță in the second half, he made an error that led to Dinamo's second goal and then received a yellow card for fouling the goalscorer. He played only a few league games before completing the season with Sfîntul Gheorghe.

In June 2012 he joined Speranţa Crihana Veche, newly promoted to the National Division.

International career
Ochincă represented Moldova under-16 team during the qualification campaign for the 2001 UEFA Under-16 Championships. He made his debut in a 2–2 draw against Israel on 5 March 2001. In February 2005, he was capped for the under-21 team, coming on as a late substitute in a friendly match away to Romania under-21 which Moldova lost 2–1.

References

External links
 
 
 
 

1984 births
Living people
Moldovan footballers
Association football defenders
FC Politehnica Chișinău players
FC Gloria Buzău players
FC Iskra-Stal players
FC Rapid Ghidighici players
FC Academia Chișinău players
FC Milsami Orhei players
FC Sfîntul Gheorghe players
FC Speranța Crihana Veche players
Speranța Nisporeni players
FC Codru Lozova players
Dacia Buiucani players
Moldovan Super Liga players
Liga I players
Moldovan expatriate footballers
Expatriate footballers in Romania
Moldovan expatriate sportspeople in Romania